Jerrick is a surname and given name. Notable people with the name include: 

 Surname

Mike Jerrick (born 1950), American news anchor

Given name

Jerrick Ahanmisi (born 1997), American-born Filipino-Nigerian basketball player
Jerrick Harding (born 1998), American basketball player